Richard Cohee (November 26, 1939 – October 11, 2013) was a Canadian football player who played for the Hamilton Tiger-Cats, Montreal Alouettes, Ottawa Rough Riders, and Saskatchewan Roughriders. He won the Grey Cup with the Tiger-Cats in 1965 and 1967. He played college football at the Reedley College. Cohee died of cancer in 2013.

References

1939 births
Hamilton Tiger-Cats players
2013 deaths
Montreal Alouettes players
Ottawa Rough Riders players
Saskatchewan Roughriders players
Reedley Tigers football players
People from Wichita Falls, Texas